Charles Amoah (born 28 February 1975) is a Ghanaian former footballer who played as a striker.

Career
Born in Accra, Amoah played for Okwawu United, FC Winterthur, FC Frauenfeld, FC Wil, St. Gallen, Sturm Graz, Austria Salzburg, ASK Kottingbrunn and LASK.

Amoah was top scorer in the Swiss Super League during the 1999–00 season, contributing 25 goals to St. Gallen's title-winning season. At St. Gallen he also memorably scored one of the goals and provided an assist as they overturned a 1–0 first-leg deficit to win 2–0 in the second leg and eliminate Premier League side Chelsea from the 2000–01 UEFA Cup.

Following Amoah's successes at St. Gallen, Austrian Bundesliga club SK Sturm Graz paid a transfer fee of 6.5 million Swiss francs (about €4.3 million) to sign him.

He earned 15 caps for the Ghana national team between 1999 and 2003, scoring 10 goals.

References

1975 births
Living people
Ghanaian footballers
Ghana international footballers
Okwawu United players
FC Winterthur players
FC Frauenfeld players
FC Wil players
FC St. Gallen players
SK Sturm Graz players
FC Red Bull Salzburg players
LASK players
Swiss Super League players
Austrian Football Bundesliga players
Association football forwards
Ghanaian expatriate footballers
Ghanaian expatriate sportspeople in Switzerland
Expatriate footballers in Switzerland
Ghanaian expatriate sportspeople in Austria
Expatriate footballers in Austria
Ghana Premier League top scorers